Marie Kingué (fl. 1785) was a famous midwife, kaperlata medicine woman and voodoo priestess active in Saint Domingue. 

Marie Kingué was a slave, officially active as a midwife on a plantation outside Cap-Francais during the 1770s and 1780s.  She was famous all over the colony as a voodoo priestess and medicine woman.  She sold amulets and proposed magical services.  She also had many followers as well as pupils.  She was hired not only by the slaves, but also among white people and slave owners, who also believed in her purported powers. It was said that she knew the secrets of every plantation in her area.  She was often engaged by white slave owners to perform ceremonies in order to cure suspected so-called Macandal poisonings (named after Francois Macandal), in which slaves were suspected of committing suicides, or reveal slave conspiracies. She was a controversial figure and made friends as well as enemies among both slaves and slave owners, black, white and free people of color.  She was reported to the authorities in 1785 for quackery and accused of trying to encourage a slave rebellion, but hidden by her followers.

References

 Karol Kimberlee Weaver:  Medical Revolutionaries: The Enslaved Healers of Eighteenth-century Saint Domingue
 Crystal Nicole Eddins, African Diaspora Collective Action: Rituals, Runaways, And Thea Haitian Revolution, 2017

Haitian slaves
Haitian Vodou practitioners
Supernatural legends
18th-century occultists